Universidad Gerardo Barrios, commonly known as Universidad, is a university in San Miguel, El Salvador.

External links
 Jocoro, con fuego retardado - El Diario de Hoy 
 El 'Waterloo' de Barrios - El Diario de Hoy 

Defunct football clubs in El Salvador